Bundar Razi was an Iranian poet of the 10th and 11th-centuries, who composed poetry in New Persian and his own local dialect. A native of Ray, Bundar served at the court of the Buyid ruler Majd al-Dawla.

According to the modern historian Hassan Rezai Baghbidi, while the local dialect that Bundar wrote in has been called Fahlawi or even Daylami, it is in reality the Razi dialect.

References

Sources 
 
  
 
 

Buyid-period poets
10th-century Iranian people
11th-century Iranian people
People from Ray, Iran